Hamburga (minor planet designation: 449 Hamburga) is a carbonaceous asteroid from the background population of the intermediate asteroid belt, approximately 75 kilometers in diameter. It was discovered by German astronomers Max Wolf and Friedrich Schwassmann at Heidelberg Observatory on 31 October 1899, and later named after the city of Hamburg in Germany.

449 was a proposed target for the 1980s-1990s space probe mission proposal CRAF.

Description 

Hamburga is classified as a C-type asteroid and is probably composed of carbonaceous material. It is named for the city of Hamburg in Germany. The name was announced in 1901 during a festival held by the Mathematical Society of Hamburg.

449 Hamburga was identified as one of three asteroids that were likely to be a parent body for chondrites along with 304 Olga and 335 Roberta. All three asteroids were known to have low-albedo (not reflect as much light) and be close to "meteorite producing resonances". Chrondrites are the most common type of meteor found on Earth, accounting for over 80% of all meteors. They are named for the tiny spherical silicate particles that are found inside them (those particles are called chondrules).

Proposed spacecraft visit

In the 1980s and 1990s, NASA considered a spacecraft mission to the asteroid. The mission plan called for a launch in 1995 and a flyby of Hamburga in early 1998. The McDonald's chain of restaurants expressed an interest in sponsoring the mission, due the accidental similarity of the asteroid's name to the food item "hamburger", which was discussed in exploratory meetings between themselves and NASA.

In August 1988 in the United States' city of Baltimore, P. Weissman addressed the International Astronomical Union on a mission to this asteroid (449), a mission which also include a rendezvous with Comet Kopf. See Comet Rendezvous Asteroid Flyby for more on the mission to the comet. This mission can also be compared to Rosetta, which successfully flew by two minor planets and orbited a Comet during its approach to the Sun in the early 21st century. P. Weissman later worked on the Rosetta mission.

Study
It was predicted that 449 occulted the star HIP 1424 in July 2013. Stellar occultations can allow a chord to be calculated.

An asteroid occultation was predicted for 18 Oct 2018 with the magnitude 12 star UCAC4-557-042266.

See also 
 List of asteroids formerly targeted for spacecraft visitation
 Comet Rendezvous Asteroid Flyby
 723 Hammonia (also named for the city of Hamburg)
 List of minor planets: 1–1000 (approx. 1801-1923)

References

External links 
 Asteroid Lightcurve Database (LCDB), query form (info )
 Dictionary of Minor Planet Names, Google books
 Asteroids and comets rotation curves, CdR – Observatoire de Genève, Raoul Behrend
 Discovery Circumstances: Numbered Minor Planets (1)-(5000) – Minor Planet Center
 
 

000449
Discoveries by Max Wolf
Discoveries by Friedrich Karl Arnold Schwassmann
Named minor planets
000449
18991031